Ampliatus (Amplias in the King James Version), was a Roman Christian mentioned by Paul in one of his letters, where he says, "Greet Ampliatus, whom I love in the Lord." (Romans 16:8)  He is considered one of the Seventy Disciples by the Eastern Orthodox Church. Tradition has it that he and his companions subsequently attached themselves to the Apostle Saint Andrew, and ultimately died martyrs.  

He may have served as bishop of Odessos (Varna), in Bulgaria. He is commemorated in the Roman Martyrology on Oct. 31.

Hymns
Troparion (Tone 3)
Holy Apostles of the Seventy: Stáchys, Amplías, Úrban,
Narcíssus, Apélles, and Aristobúlus,
entreat the merciful God
to grant our souls forgiveness of transgressions.
Kontakion (Tone 8)
Let us thankfully praise the wise Apostles
Stáchys, Amplías, Úrban, Narcíssus, Apélles, and Aristobúlus,
those treasures of the Holy Spirit and rays of the Sun of glory,
who were gathered together by the grace of our God.

References

External links
Apostle Amplias of the Seventy (OCA)
Amplias, Apellos, Stachyos, Urbanos, Aristovoulos & Narcissos of the 70 (GOARCH)

St. Nikolai Velimirovic, The Prologue from Ohrid

Seventy disciples
People in the Pauline epistles
Christian saints from the New Testament